Der Half-Machine is a two track EP by electronic artist The Juan MacLean, formerly of Six Finger Satellite. It was released on DFA Records in March 2005. It was meant as a preview of the upcoming full-length album Less Than Human. Neither of these tracks were released on the Less Than Human album but are both available on the DFA Compilation, Vol. 2.

Track listing
"I Robot" – 6:12
"Less Than Human" – 4:14

References 

The Juan MacLean albums
Dance-punk albums
2005 EPs